Dalakdere is a  village in Toroslar district of Mersin Province, Turkey where the capital city of Toroslar district is actually a part of Greater Mersin. It is situated on the road connecting Mersin to Gözne and along a creek. The green landscape around the creek is suitable for a recreation spot and there are several restaurants servicing Mersin citizens. The population of the village was 520 as of 2012 Most of the village inhabitants are actually retired people of  Tahtacı (Alevi- Turkmen) origin

References

Villages in Toroslar District